Eremophila hygrophana is a flowering plant in the figwort family, Scrophulariaceae and is endemic to Australia. It is an erect, compact shrub with crowded, grey leaves and violet to purple flowers and is native to South Australia and Western Australia.

Description
The older parts of the branches are rough due to persistent leaf bases.

The flowers are borne singly in leaf axils and lack a stalk. The petal tube is pale violet to purple on the outside and paler, spotted purple inside the tube. As the flowers age, their colour changes to dark reddish brown. The outside of the tube and petal lobes are hairy but the inside of the lobes is glabrous and the inside of the tube is woolly. The 4 stamens are fully enclosed in the petal tube.

Taxonomy and naming 
Eremophila hygrophana was first formally described by Robert Chinnock in 2007 and the description was published in Eremophila and Allied Genera: A Monograph of the Plant Family Myoporaceae. The specific epithet (hygrophana) is derived from Ancient Greek words meaning "changing colour during the drying process".

Distribution and habitat
This eremophila occurs mostly commonly in Western Australia where it is found from near Rawlinna to Mount Magnet, growing in the Gibson Desert, Little Sandy Desert, Murchison, Nullarbor Plain and Yalgoo biogeographic regions. It is also found in the extreme central west of South Australia. A single record from the Northern Territory may be a new, as yet undescribed species.

Conservation status
Eremophila hygrophana is classified as "not threatened" by the Western Australian Government Department of Parks and Wildlife.

Use in horticulture
This small eremophila is one of the most attractive in cultivation with its sometimes golden, furry leaves and large purple flowers which are present through most months. It grows particularly well in Melbourne. It, especially the cultivar "Blue Bells", is well known in gardens in the drier parts of the United States. It can be propagated from cuttings taken in warm weather, or by grafting onto Myoporum rootstock. Grafted plants perform better in heavy soils. It is tolerant of drought but not humidity so a sunny, open position is preferred. It is tolerant of light frost, although may need a light pruning to remove frost damaged branches.

References

Eudicots of Western Australia
hygrophana
Endemic flora of Western Australia
Plants described in 2007
Taxa named by Robert Chinnock